Arlette Fortin (1949 – August 11, 2009) was a Canadian writer.

The daughter of René Fortin and Mariette Huot, she was born in Jonquière, Quebec. Her first novel C'est la faute au bonheur received the Prix Robert-Cliche. It was followed by La vie est une virgule in 2007 and Clara Tremblay chesseldéenne (2010). She also contributed to various literary revues including Poésie de Québec.

He received the Robert-Cliche Award in 2001 for his first novel C'est la error au bonheur

Fortin was married to Jocelyn Belley and lived in Lévis.

She died at the Hôtel-Dieu de Québec at the age of 60.

Rue Arlette-Fortin in Lévis was named in her honour.

References 

1949 births
2009 deaths
Canadian novelists in French
Canadian women novelists
Canadian poets in French
Canadian women poets
Writers from Saguenay, Quebec